Ataeniopsis is a genus of aphodiine dung beetles in the family Scarabaeidae. There are about 15 described species in Ataeniopsis.

Species
These 15 species belong to the genus Ataeniopsis:

 Ataeniopsis armasi (Chalumeau, 1982)
 Ataeniopsis carupanoi Stebnicka, 2003
 Ataeniopsis duncani (Cartwright, 1974)
 Ataeniopsis edistoi (Cartwright, 1974)
 Ataeniopsis figurator (Harold, 1874)
 Ataeniopsis haroldi (Steinheil, 1872)
 Ataeniopsis jaltipani Stebnicka, 2003
 Ataeniopsis notabilis Petrovitz, 1973
 Ataeniopsis parallelus (Petrovitz, 1961)
 Ataeniopsis parkeri (Cartwright, 1974)
 Ataeniopsis pusillus (Burmeister, 1877)
 Ataeniopsis regulus (Balthasar, 1947)
 Ataeniopsis rugopygus (Cartwright, 1974)
 Ataeniopsis saxatilis (Cartwright, 1944)
 Ataeniopsis vinacoensis Stebnicka, 2003

References

Further reading

 
 
 

Scarabaeidae genera
Articles created by Qbugbot